Star is an urban locality (a work settlement) in Dyatkovsky District of Bryansk Oblast, Russia. Population: 

It was established in 1785 and was granted urban-type settlement status in 1927.

References

Notes

Sources

Urban-type settlements in Bryansk Oblast
Oryol Governorate